Amblyptilia skoui is a moth of the family Pterophoridae.

References

Moths described in 1999
Amblyptilia